Wilhelm von der Wense (floruit 1580-1610) was a German courtier and Danish diplomat.

Wilhelm von der Wense was a servant of Sophie of Mecklenburg-Güstrow, wife of Frederick II of Denmark.

In 1587 he came to London with letters for the Earl of Leicester from Frederick II.

In 1589 he became master of household to Anne of Denmark, the bride of James VI of Scotland. He came to Scotland with Anne of Denmark in May 1590 to ensure her well-being while she was learning the Scottish language. He left in October 1590, first travelling to the English court. James VI gave him instructions to discuss a Protestant league in Europe with his wife's relations. Colonel William Stewart wrote to William Cecil about this mission. Wense travelled to England with Gotthard, Count of Starhemberg (1563-1624).

On his return to Denmark, he reported to Queen Sophie on the situation of her daughter in Scotland. Sophie wrote from Koldinghus on 23 November 1590 and again on 1 July 1591 from Kronborg to the Scottish chancellor, John Maitland of Thirlestane, thanking him for his foresight and the care he had taken in making arrangements and provisions for the queen's household.

Wilhelm von der Wense, like other German and Danish nobles, signed several autograph books.

His name appears in several versions in Scottish records, including "William Vanderwant" or "Vandervantt".

References

Court of Frederick II of Denmark
Household of Anne of Denmark
16th-century German people
Danish courtiers